Lindy Melissa Løvbræk Wiik (born 7 February 1985 in Slemmestad) is a Norwegian footballer who plays for Urædd FK and the Norway national team.

Career
Asker played in the elite Toppserien league in Norway, and Wiik was the league's top scorer of the 2007 season, with 22 goals from 22 matches. At the start of 2009 Wiik with most of the other Asker players joined the newly formed Stabæk Fotball Kvinner, continuing in the Toppserien. In January 2010 Wiik signed to play for the German club VfL Wolfsburg, and scored her first three goals for her new club at an indoor tournament on 23 January with over 4000 spectators.

In 2011 Wiik returned to Stabæk FK. In early May she suffered a damaged anterior cruciate ligament, surgery followed in June. Her goal to recover quickly materialized with her in Football training by early October.

Career statistics
Statistics accurate as of match played 10 August 2013

International career
She is a member of the Norway national team. She was named on 9 June to the bronze medalist team Norway at the 2008 Summer Olympics, held in Beijing, China. At the opening match on 6 August she scored Norway's second goal in the fourth minute, which ended Norway 2 – USA 0.

Personal life
She has a relationship with Péter Kovács.

Honours

Club
Stabæk
 Toppserien (1): 2013
 Norwegian Cup (3): 2011, 2012, 2013

Individual
 Top Scorer, Toppserien (1): 2007 (22 goals)

References

External links 
 
 
 
 Profile at Stabæk 
 
 

1985 births
Living people
People from Røyken
Norwegian women's footballers
Norway women's international footballers
Footballers at the 2008 Summer Olympics
Olympic footballers of Norway
VfL Wolfsburg (women) players
Expatriate women's footballers in Germany
Asker Fotball (women) players
Stabæk Fotball Kvinner players
Toppserien players
Norwegian expatriate sportspeople in Germany
2007 FIFA Women's World Cup players
Sportspeople from Viken (county)

Association football forwards
Women's association football forwards
Expatriate footballers in Germany